Stoneman's 1864 raid also known as Stoneman's raid into Southwest Virginia was an American Civil War expedition into southwest Virginia by Cavalry and Infantry regiments, including the 3rd North Carolina Mounted Infantry, under Union Maj. Gen. George Stoneman, designed to disrupt infrastructure beneficial to the Confederate war effort. This expedition resulted in the Battle of Marion and the Second Battle of Saltville against a Confederate force under the command of John C. Breckinridge and accomplished the destruction of the saltworks at Saltville, Virginia.

References

 
Cavalry raids of the American Civil War
Military operations of the American Civil War in Virginia
1864 in Virginia
1864 in the American Civil War